By the People: The Election of Barack Obama is a 2009 documentary film produced by Edward Norton broadcast in November 2009 on HBO, which follows Barack Obama and various members of his campaign team, including David Axelrod, through the two years leading up to the United States presidential election on November 4, 2008.

Proceeds from the sale of the soundtrack of this film went to United Way and Enterprise Community Partners. Both organizations will put the funds toward rebuilding efforts in the Gulf Coast region.

External links
 
 New Documentary on Barack Obama’s Historic Presidential Run - video report by Democracy Now!

2009 films
American documentary films
Barack Obama 2008 presidential campaign
Documentary films about elections in the United States
2009 documentary films
HBO documentary films
2008 United States presidential election in popular culture
Films about presidential elections
2000s English-language films
2000s American films